Zeynab Javadli (born 19 July 1991), is an Azerbaijani former rhythmic gymnast, World and European Championship medalist. She is the ex-wife of Emirati Sheikh Saeed bin Maktoum bin Rashid Al Maktoum, with whom she is involved in a controversial custody battle.

Career 
Javadli was born in Baku.  She has won the national championship of Azerbaijan several times. She was a participant in the 2006 European Championships in the junior section (8th place for the performance with the clubs); she won the 4th place in the World Club Championships held in Japan in 2006. In 2006 Javadli won four gold medals at the international tournament in Slovenia, and became the overall winner of the tournament. Javadli won silver and bronze medals in separate performances at the international tournament in Portugal and a gold medal at the international tournament in Bulgaria for the performance with the hoop. She is a bronze medalist of the international tournament held in Russia, where she received the title "Miss Elegance".

External links 
 
 

1991 births
Living people
Azerbaijani rhythmic gymnasts
Sportspeople from Baku
Medalists at the Rhythmic Gymnastics World Championships
Medalists at the Rhythmic Gymnastics European Championships
21st-century Azerbaijani women